The 2020–21 season was Ayr United's 3rd consecutive season in the Scottish Championship after being promoted from league one in the 2017–18 season. Ayr also competed in the, League Cup and the Scottish Cup. On 2 October 2020, the SPFL confirmed that the Scottish Challenge Cup had been cancelled for the upcoming season.

Summary

Season
Ayr began the season on 6 October in the League Cup group stages with the Scottish Championship season set to begin on 17th October. Club chairman Lachlan Cameron stepped down from his position in January 2021 after 13 years in the role with local businessman David Smith being appointed in his place.

Results and fixtures

Scottish Championship

Scottish League Cup

Group stage
Results

Knockout round

Scottish Cup

Squad statistics

Appearances

|-
|colspan="10"|Players who left the club during the 2020–21 season
|-

|}

Team statistics

League table

League Cup table

Transfers

Transfers in

Transfers out

Loans in

Loans out

References 

Ayr United F.C. seasons
Ayr